Test match in some sports refers to a sporting contest between national representative teams and may refer to:

 Test cricket
 Test match (indoor cricket)
 Test match (rugby union)
 Test match (rugby league)
 Test match (association football)
 Test match (netball)
 Test Match (board game), cricket-themed board game